Bear Creek Township is one of seventeen townships in Christian County, Illinois, USA.  As of the 2020 census, its population was 516 and it contained 227 housing units.

Geography

Cities, towns, villages
 Palmer

Unincorporated towns
 Clarksdale at

Cemeteries
The township contains these three cemeteries: Anderson, Durbin and Palmer.

Major highways
  Illinois Route 48

Demographics
As of the 2020 census there were 516 people, 222 households, and 177 families residing in the township. The racial makeup of the township was 94.19% White, 0.19% African American, 0.58% Native American, 0.00% Asian, 0.00% Pacific Islander, 0.58% from other races, and 4.46% from two or more races. Hispanic or Latino of any race were 0.39% of the population.

There were 222 households, out of which 28.80% had children under the age of 18 living with them, 59.01% were married couples living together, 13.51% had a female householder with no spouse present, and 20.27% were non-families. 16.70% of all households were made up of individuals, and 11.30% had someone living alone who was 65 years of age or older. The average household size was 2.29 and the average family size was 2.54.

The township's age distribution consisted of 18.1% under the age of 18, 8.1% from 18 to 24, 19.6% from 25 to 44, 34.1% from 45 to 64, and 20.0% who were 65 years of age or older. The median age was 46.9 years. For every 100 females, there were 91.4 males. For every 100 females age 18 and over, there were 100.5 males.

The median income for a household in the township was $71,250, and the median income for a family was $85,125. Males had a median income of $41,818 versus $37,857 for females. The per capita income for the township was $38,095. About 2.8% of families and 4.5% of the population were below the poverty line, including 4.3% of those under age 18 and 1.0% of those age 65 or over.

School districts
 Morrisonville Community Unit School District 1
 Taylorville Community Unit School District 3

Political districts
 State House District 98
 State Senate District 49

References
 
 United States Census Bureau 2009 TIGER/Line Shapefiles
 United States National Atlas

External links
 City-Data.com
 Illinois State Archives
 Township Officials of Illinois

Townships in Christian County, Illinois
Populated places established in 1865
Townships in Illinois